James McSparran QC (1 May 1892 – 15 April 1970), was an Irish barrister and nationalist politician.

McSparran was born in Glasgow to an Irish family  He studied at St Mungo's Academy, Glasgow, then St Malachy's College in Belfast, Queen's University of Belfast, and the National University of Ireland.

McSparran was called to the Irish Bar in 1916, and later became a King's Counsel.  He also had interests in the Irish News.

Political career
At the 1945 Northern Ireland general election, McSparran was elected for the Nationalist Party in Mourne: during his own campaign McSparran emphasised the need for northern nationalists to unite to help themselves, as well as promoting their aim to end partition.

He immediately became the Chairman of the Nationalist Party at Stormont, and was the founding Chairman of the Anti-Partition of Ireland League. In 1953, he became instead the President of the League, and in 1958, he stood down from Parliament and his position as Chairman of the Nationalist Party in order to concentrate on his legal career.

McSparran remained active as a barrister and supported the Northern Ireland Civil Rights Association.

An avid Glasgow Celtic fan, he died in Hampden Park as he watched the European Cup semi-final between Glasgow Celtic and Leeds United.

Family life

McSparran had, through his Antrim roots, deep connections with many prominent Catholic families with clerical links and business interests. His brothers included Canon John McSparran, a senior priest of the Diocese of Down and Connor and Dr. Daniel McSparran, Chairman of The Irish News newspaper and Chair of Belfast Celtic.

His son, James D. McSparran QC also practised at the Northern Ireland Bar.

References

1892 births
1970 deaths
Irish barristers
Leaders of political parties in Northern Ireland
Members of the House of Commons of Northern Ireland 1945–1949
Members of the House of Commons of Northern Ireland 1949–1953
Members of the House of Commons of Northern Ireland 1953–1958
Nationalist Party (Ireland) members of the House of Commons of Northern Ireland
People educated at St Mungo's Academy
Politicians from Glasgow
Scottish people of Irish descent
Alumni of Queen's University Belfast
British King's Counsel
Members of the House of Commons of Northern Ireland for County Down constituencies